Julie Ellyn Strauss-Gabel is an American publisher and editor of books for young adults who is notable for getting numerous titles on The New York Times Best Seller list.

Early life and education
Strauss-Gabel grew up in White Plains, New York, the daughter of a forensic photographer and a teacher of home economics. She attended Amherst College where she edited the college newspaper, The Amherst Student, and met her future husband. She graduated cum laude from Amherst, then graduated from the Harvard Graduate School of Education.

Career
Strauss-Gabel was associate editor at Clarion Books and was later an editor at Hyperion Books for five years. She is editor and publisher at Dutton Books, an imprint of the Penguin Group.
In one week in April 2015, novels that she edited occupied five of the top ten spots. According to one count, she has edited 22 books which were New York Times Bestsellers. She edited numerous titles such as Will Grayson, Will Grayson, a story of two young men sharing the same name but who had different sexual orientations. Her books have won numerous book awards, including the Printz, two Edgars, a Boston Globe-Horn, and the E.B. White Read Aloud Award. She has been described as having a knack for spotting talent and nourishing writers. She was instrumental in helping novelist John Green create the blockbuster book The Fault in Our Stars, a story about the inconvenience of teenage love in the face of tragedy.

Personal life
Strauss-Gabel married David Feldman, a writer and puppeteer for children's television, in 2000.

References

American publishers (people)
Amherst College alumni
Harvard Graduate School of Education alumni
Living people
Businesspeople from New York City
People from Bedford Hills, New York
1972 births
American book editors